JemJem is an E-commerce website for refurbished Apple products, mainly catering to iPhone, iPad, MacBook and Accessories in the United States. Launched in 2014, it is headed by Jay Kim and is based in Costa Mesa, California. JemJem is the third largest website for refurbished iPhone and iPad in the United States, as rated by the popular American internet media company BuzzFeed.

History
JemJem was founded by Jay Kim in 2014 and operated through Amazon initially. but later, they shifted the focus to the sale of refurbished Apple iPads and later refurbished versions of iPhones, Macbooks and other Apple products.

In June 2016, JemJem partnered with FedEx for an International expansion. Also in 2016, JemJem was awarded the Google Trusted Stores Badge.

In June 2017, JemJem partnered with Walmart to sell its products.

In February 2018, JemJem was certified to sell its products through Amazon's Certified Refurbished program. The certification means JemJem's products are backed by Amazon's Return Policies.

References

Internet properties established in 2014
Privately held companies based in California
Online retailers of the United States
American companies established in 2014
Companies based in Newport Beach, California